6th NSFC Awards
December 24, 1971

Best Film: 
 Claire's Knee 
The 6th National Society of Film Critics Awards, given on 24 December 1971, honored the best filmmaking of 1971.

Winners

Best Picture 
1. Claire's Knee (Le genou de Claire)
2. The Conformist (Il conformista)
3. A Clockwork Orange

Best Director 
Bernardo Bertolucci – The Conformist (Il conformista)

Best Actor 
Peter Finch – Sunday Bloody Sunday

Best Actress 
Jane Fonda – Klute

Best Supporting Actor 
Bruce Dern – Drive, He Said

Best Supporting Actress 
Ellen Burstyn – The Last Picture Show

Best Screenplay 
Penelope Gilliatt – Sunday Bloody Sunday

Best Cinematography 
Vittorio Storaro – The Conformist (Il conformista)

Special Award 
The Sorrow and the Pity (Le chagrin et la pitié)

References

External links
Past Awards

1971
National Society of Film Critics Awards
National Society of Film Critics Awards
National Society of Film Critics Awards